Jan-Michael Grantley Williams (born 26 October 1984) is a Trinidadian football coach and semi-retired professional footballer who serves as a player–goalkeeper coach for Canadian club HFX Wanderers.

Over the course of his playing career, Williams made 80 appearances for the Trinidad and Tobago national football team and played professionally in Trinidad, Belgium, Hungary, Honduras, Guatemala and Canada.

Club career

W Connection
Williams was a goalkeeper for W Connection in Trinidad and Tobago who had trials with Rangers in 2003 alongside Kenwyne Jones. He was the Pro League Player of the Year in 2006 as well as the T & T Pro League Goalkeeper of the year in 2006.

On March 27, 2007 he was the first goalkeeper to score in a Pro Bowl game when he scored a header against United Petrotrin in injury time to send the tie into extra-time and penalties. He saved 2 penalties to send his team into the final of the 2007 Pro Bowl competition. The final, against Superstar Rangers also went to a penalty shoot-out when Williams saved another 2 penalties to help his team win the T&T Pro League Trophy.

With W Connection Williams has a T&T PFL Championship winners medal, earned in 2005 and a CFU Club Champions Cup winners medal, earned in 2006.

White Star Woluwe
Williams again left his country in June 2007 for trials with Hungarian club Újpest FC who offered him a contract but he delayed his decision in order to trial with Sheffield United. In July 2007, while on trial with Sheffield United, Williams played in a pre-season friendly against Alfreton Town. On July 25, 2007, Williams was offered a contract by Sheffield United. While waiting for his work permit, he signed a short-term contract with Belgian Third Division side White Star Woluwe.

Ferencváros
After he had his work permit application rejected, he signed a 1+1 year contract with Ferencváros on July 15, 2008. He played his first game for the green and white club against Sheffield United the previous day. Williams was in summer 2009 released rejoined W Connection.

Williams again left his country in August 2011 on trial with Belgian Third Division club ROCCM where he joined fellow T&T teammate Radanfah Abu Bakr.

Central FC
Williams signed with Trinidadian club Central FC for 3 years, he also played in the CONCACAF Champions League.

Juticalpa
In 2017 was bought by Hondurian First Division team Juticalpa and played 9 games and spend another 21 in the bench.

Sacachispas
In the next couple of years Sacachispas a Second Division team in Guatemala was his team.

HFX Wanderers
Williams signed with HFX Wanderers on 10 January 2019. He was named the first ever captain of the squad, and made his debut against Pacific FC in the club's inaugural match on 28 April 2019. Williams suffered injury problems as the season went on, and partway through the season backup Christian Oxner took as the number one. He went on to make twelve league appearances that season and three in the Canadian Championship. Williams retired at the end of the season, but was hired on with the club as a goalkeeping coach. 

On August 11, 2020 after an injury to Oxner, HFX announced Williams would come out of retirement temporarily to serve as back-up to Jason Beaulieu during the 2020 Canadian Premier League season.

International career
Williams was selected as the second-choice goalkeeper for T&T at the 2001 FIFA Under 17 World Championship. He was also part of the 2003 Under-23 squad.

Williams was selected as Trinidad's number 1 for the 2007 CONCACAF Gold Cup where he played against El Salvador, Guatemala and United States.

Coaching career
On 10 December 2019, Williams retired and was appointed as the new goalkeeper coach for HFX Wanderers.

References

External links
 
 

1984 births
Living people
Association football goalkeepers
Trinidad and Tobago footballers
People from Couva–Tabaquite–Talparo
Trinidad and Tobago expatriate footballers
Expatriate footballers in Belgium
Trinidad and Tobago expatriate sportspeople in Belgium
Expatriate footballers in Hungary
Trinidad and Tobago expatriate sportspeople in Hungary
Expatriate soccer players in Canada
Trinidad and Tobago expatriate sportspeople in Canada
Expatriate footballers in Honduras
Trinidad and Tobago expatriate sportspeople in Honduras
Expatriate footballers in Guatemala
Trinidad and Tobago expatriate sportspeople in Guatemala
W Connection F.C. players
RWS Bruxelles players
Ferencvárosi TC footballers
St. Ann's Rangers F.C. players
Central F.C. players
North East Stars F.C. players
Juticalpa F.C. players
HFX Wanderers FC players
TT Pro League players
Belgian Third Division players
Nemzeti Bajnokság II players
Pacific Coast Soccer League players
Liga Nacional de Fútbol Profesional de Honduras players
Canadian Premier League players
Trinidad and Tobago under-20 international footballers
Trinidad and Tobago international footballers
2007 CONCACAF Gold Cup players
2013 CONCACAF Gold Cup players
2014 Caribbean Cup players
2015 CONCACAF Gold Cup players
HFX Wanderers FC non-playing staff